Nicolás Magno (born 19 September 1996) is an Argentine professional footballer who plays as a midfielder for Acassuso.

Career
Magno started his career in the ranks of Acassuso. He came off the substitutes bench in three Primera B Metropolitana fixtures across the 2016–17 and 2017–18 campaigns, including for his professional debut on 25 October 2016 versus Fénix. Magno's opening career start came in his third campaign, as he played the full duration of a 1–1 home draw with San Miguel in October 2018.

Career statistics
.

References

External links

1996 births
Living people
Place of birth missing (living people)
Argentine footballers
Association football midfielders
Primera B Metropolitana players
Club Atlético Acassuso footballers